Ballet Fest Sarajevo is an annual ballet festival held in Sarajevo, Bosnia and Herzegovina. It is held in September of every year and lasts for 7 days. The festival was established in 2010 by the Sarajevo National Theatre and the Sarajevo Ballet. It is devoted to contemporary author choreography and showcases the most established ballets from Southeastern Europe. It is the only ballet festival in Bosnia and Herzegovina.

References

External links
 Official website

Recurring events established in 2010
September events
Tourist attractions in Sarajevo
Annual events in Bosnia and Herzegovina
Dance festivals
Ballet
Festivals in Sarajevo